Nyishi (also known as Nishi, Nisi, Nishang, Nissi, Nyising, Leil, Aya, Akang,  Bangni-Bangru, Solung) is a Sino-Tibetan language of the Tani branch spoken in Papum Pare, Lower Subansiri, Kurung Kumey, Kra Daadi, East Kameng, Pakke Kesang, Kamle districts of Arunachal Pradesh and Darrang District of Assam in India. According to the 2011 census of India, the population of the Nishi speakers is approximately 300,000. Though there are plenty of variations across regions, the dialects of Nishi, such as Akang, Aya, Nyishi (raga), Mishing, Tagin are easily mutually intelligible, with the exception of the rather small in population Bangni-Bangru and Solung Dialects being very different from the former.  'Nisi' is sometimes used as a cover term for western Tani languages.

Nishi is a subject–object–verb language.

Origin 
The main origin of this language has been pointed out by George Abraham Grierson as ‘Dafla’. He included different varieties under a common name which is known as North Assam group. The varieties are Dafla, Miri and Abor according to him. Daflas used to denote them as ‘Nyi-Shi’. these tribes inhabited between the Assam Valley and Tibet. Then they started to spread in Lakhimpur, Sibsagar and Darrang Districts of Assam. Mr. William Robinson in his notes mentioned that Daflas were spread over a region from 92°50’ to 94° north latitude.

The word nyishi itself means "upland man", and is a compound of nyi ("man") and shi ("highland").

They are probably descendants of peoples who separated from Khasi 4,200 years ago.

Phonology

Nishi is a tonal language that utilizes three tones: rising, neutral, and falling. These can be applied to all of its vowels, and often can change the word's meaning:

 bénam – "to hold"
 benam – "to deliver"
 bènam – "to vomit"

These are the consonants of Nyishi. Where the orthography differs from the IPA, the orthography is bolded.

Grammar
Nyishi distinguishes between number, person, and case. It does not have a gender system, but special affixes can be added to nouns to denote gender.

Pronouns

Vocabulary

Numerals 

		
The counting system differs when referring to human vs. non-human objects.

References

Further reading
Post, Mark W. (2013).  Paper presented at the 13th Himalayan Languages Symposium. Canberra, Australian National University, Aug 9.

Languages of Assam
Languages of Arunachal Pradesh
Tani languages
Endangered languages of India
Tonal languages
Subject–object–verb languages
Endangered Sino-Tibetan languages